Duško Devčić (born 16 March 1948 in Rijeka, Croatia) is a Croatian retired football player.

Club career
He was one of Rijeka's most capped and best regarded defenders of all time. He had played for Rijeka for eleven seasons and had captained the club when it got promoted to the Yugoslav First League in 1974. In 1976, he moved to Switzerland where he continued his career with Lausanne Sports.

References

1948 births
Living people
Footballers from Rijeka
Association football defenders
Yugoslav footballers
HNK Rijeka players
FC Lausanne-Sport players
Yugoslav First League players
Yugoslav expatriate footballers
Expatriate footballers in Switzerland
Yugoslav expatriate sportspeople in Switzerland